Dsungaripteroidea is a group of pterosaurs within the suborder Pterodactyloidea.

Evolutionary history
The earliest known fossils attributed to this group are from the Kimmeridgian-age Upper Jurassic Argiles d'Octeville Formation of France, dated to around 155 million years ago, and belonging to the species Normannognathus wellnhoferi.

Classification
The Dsungaripteroidea was defined in 2003 by David Unwin. Unwin made Dsungaripteroidea the most inclusive clade containing both Dsungaripterus weii and Germanodactylus cristatus. Unwin at that time considered those two species to be close relatives. However, more recent studies have shown Germanodactylus to be much more primitive, either an archaeopterodactyloid or a primitive member of the Eupterodactyloidea. This makes Dsungaripteroidea a much larger group.

Alexander Kellner in 2003 defined Dsungaripteroidea very differently as the group containing the last common ancestor of Nyctosaurus and Quetzalcoatlus, and all its descendants. However, subsequent recent analysis use the name Ornithocheiroidea instead of Dsungaripteroidea for this definition.

Paleobiology
Dsungaripteroids sensu Unwin appear to have been largely terrestrial pterosaurs. Not only do they have thick bone walls and generally stouty bodily proportions, they also occur in inland environments, usually away from the coast. Their flight style remains largely untested, but it is speculated that it was dominated by frantic flapping and abrupt landings.

References

Pterodactyloids